The Alien Tort Statute (codified in 1948 as ; ATS), also called the Alien Tort Claims Act (ATCA), is a section in the United States Code that gives federal courts jurisdiction over lawsuits filed by foreign nationals for torts committed in violation of international law. It was first introduced by the Judiciary Act of 1789 and is one of the oldest federal laws still in effect in the U.S.

The ATS was rarely cited for nearly two centuries after its enactment, and its exact purpose and scope remain debated. The U.S. Supreme Court has interpreted the Act's primary purpose as "[promoting] harmony in international relations by ensuring foreign plaintiffs a remedy for international-law violations in circumstances where the absence of such a remedy might provoke foreign nations to hold the United States accountable."

Since 1980, courts have generally interpreted the ATS to allow foreign nationals to seek remedies in U.S. courts for human rights violations committed outside the United States, provided there is a sufficient connection to the United States. Both case law and jurisprudence differ on what characterizes a sufficient U.S. connection, particularly with respect to corporate entities.

Text
The statute reads as follows:

History
The ATS was part of the Judiciary Act of 1789, which was passed by the First U.S. Congress to establish the federal court system. There is little surviving legislative history regarding the Act, and its original meaning and purpose are uncertain. Scholars have surmised that it was intended to assure foreign governments that the U.S. would seek to prevent and remedy breaches of customary international law, especially breaches concerning diplomats and merchants.

The ATS may have been enacted in response to a number of international incidents caused by the unavailability of remedies for foreign citizens in the U.S. The peace treaty ending the American Revolutionary War provided for the satisfaction of debts to British creditors, but several states refused to enforce the payment of such debts, prompting threats of retaliation by Great Britain. In 1784, French diplomat François Barbé-Marbois was assaulted in Philadelphia, but no legal remedy was available to him, as any prosecution was left to the discretion of local authorities. The incident was notorious internationally and prompted Congress to draft a resolution asking states to allow suits in tort for the violation of the law of nations; few states enacted such a provision, and Congress subsequently included the ATS in the Judiciary Act of 1789.

However, until 1980 the ATS remained largely dormant, being invoked in only two reported court decisions.

Revitalization: Filartiga v. Pena-Irala

In 1980, the U.S. Court of Appeals for the Second Circuit decided Filártiga v. Peña-Irala, which "paved the way for a new conceptualization of the ATS". In Filartiga, two Paraguayan citizens resident in the U.S., represented by the Center for Constitutional Rights, brought suit against a Paraguayan former police chief who was also living in the United States. The plaintiffs alleged that the defendant had tortured and murdered a member of their family, and they asserted that U.S. federal courts had jurisdiction over their suit under the ATS. The district court dismissed for lack of subject-matter jurisdiction, holding that the "law of nations" does not regulate a state's treatment of its own citizens.

The Second Circuit reversed the decision of the district court. First, it held that the ATS, which allowed jurisdiction in the federal courts over a suit between two aliens, was a constitutional exercise of Congress's power, because "the law of nations...has always been part of the federal common law", and thus the statute fell within federal-question jurisdiction. Second, the court held that the contemporary law of nations had expanded to prohibit state-sanctioned torture. The court found that multilateral treaties and domestic prohibitions on torture evidenced a consistent state practice of proscribing official torture. The court similarly found that United Nations declarations, such as the Universal Declaration on Human Rights, manifested an expectation of adherence to the prohibition of official torture. The court therefore held that the right to be free from torture had become a principle of customary international law. However, one of the judges on the panel hearing the case later wrote that Filartiga "should not be misread or exaggerated to support sweeping assertions that all (or even most) international human rights norms found in the Universal Declaration or in international human rights treaties have ripened into customary international law enforceable in the domestic courts".

Since Filartiga, jurisdiction under the ATS has been upheld in dozens of cases.

First U.S. Supreme Court hearing: Sosa v. Alvarez-Machain

The first U.S. Supreme Court case to directly address the scope of the ATS was Sosa v. Alvarez-Machain in 2004. The plaintiff, Alvarez, brought a claim under ATS for arbitrary arrest and detention. He had been indicted in the United States for torturing and murdering a Drug Enforcement Administration officer. When the United States was unable to secure Alvarez's extradition, the United States paid Sosa, a Mexican national, to kidnap Alvarez and bring him into the U.S. Alvarez claimed that his "arrest" by Sosa was arbitrary because the warrant for his arrest only authorized his arrest within the U.S. The U.S. Court of Appeals for the Ninth Circuit held that Alvarez's abduction constituted arbitrary arrest in violation of international law.

The Supreme Court reversed and clarified that ATS did not create a cause of action, but instead merely "furnish[ed] jurisdiction for a relatively modest set of actions alleging violations of the law of nations." Such actions must "rest on a norm of international character accepted by the civilized world and defined with a specificity comparable to the features of the 18th-century paradigms we have recognized." Although the scope of ATS is not limited to violations of international law recognized in the 18th century, with respect to recognizing contemporary international norms, the Court's opinion stated that "the judicial power should be exercised on the understanding that the door is still ajar subject to vigilant doorkeeping."

In Alvarez's case, "a single illegal detention of less than a day, followed by the transfer of custody to lawful authorities and a prompt arraignment, violates no norm of customary international law so well defined as to support the creation of a federal remedy."

Ongoing controversy
Exercising legal jurisdiction in the United States over matters that occurred abroad is a controversial practice and some have suggested that Congress eliminate it. Others believe that a multilateral solution, including through either the Organisation for Economic Co-operation and Development or the UN, would be more appropriate.

Scope of the statute

"Violation of the Law of Nations"
The Supreme Court held in Sosa v. Alvarez-Machain that the ATS provides a cause of action for violations of international norms that are as "specific, universal, and obligatory" as were the norms prohibiting violations of safe conducts, infringements of the rights of ambassadors, and piracy in the 18th century. Courts have found torture; cruel, inhuman, or degrading treatment; genocide; war crimes; crimes against humanity; summary execution; prolonged arbitrary detention; and forced disappearance to be actionable under the ATS.

Since Sosa, courts have struggled to define the level of specificity required for a norm to be actionable under the ATS.  For example, subsequent to Sosa, the U.S. Court of Appeals for the Eleventh Circuit overturned prior lower-court decisions that had found cruel, inhuman, or degrading treatment actionable, noting that Sosa repudiated the International Covenant on Civil and Political Rights as a source of law under the ATS.  Similarly, courts have held that economic, social, and cultural rights are too indeterminate to satisfy Sosa'''s specificity requirement.  For example, in Flores v. Southern Peru Copper Corp., the Second Circuit stated that the rights to life and to health are too indeterminate to constitute a cause of action under the ATS.

The U.S. District Court for the Northern District of California, however, has held that the limits of a norm need not be defined with particularity to be actionable; rather, the norm need only be so defined that the particular acts upon which a claim is based certainly fall within the bounds of the norm.  In Doe v. Qi, the court stated, "The fact that there may be doubt at the marginsa fact that inheres in any definitiondoes not negate the essence and application of that definition in clear cases." The court also described how to determine whether specific actions fall within the proscriptions of an international norm, holding that the actions alleged should be compared with actions that international adjudicatory bodies have found to be proscribed by the norm in question.  It therefore examined decisions by institutions such as the Human Rights Committee, the European Court of Human Rights, and the African Commission on Human and Peoples' Rights to determine that pushing, hitting, and choking a plaintiff during one day of incarceration did not constitute cruel, unusual, or degrading treatment, whereas forcing a hand into a plaintiff's vagina did constitute cruel, inhuman, or degrading treatment.

Corporate liability under the statute
In 2011, there was a circuit split regarding whether corporations, as opposed to natural people, could be held liable under the ATS. In 2010 the Second Circuit Court of Appeals held in Kiobel v. Royal Dutch Petroleum Co. that "customary international law has steadfastly rejected the notion of corporate liability for international crimes"  and thus that "insofar as plaintiffs bring claims under the ATS against corporations, plaintiffs fail to allege violations of the law of nations, and plaintiffs' claims fall outside the limited jurisdiction provided by the ATS". However, the Seventh Circuit Court of Appeals, the Ninth Circuit Court of Appeals, and the D.C. Circuit Court of Appeals all ruled that corporate liability is possible under the statute.

The U.S. Supreme Court granted certiori on October 17, 2011 to answer the question of corporate liability. After arguments on February 28, 2012, the Court ordered the case to be reargued the following term on the separate question of extraterritoriality. On April 17, 2013, in Kiobel v. Royal Dutch Petroleum Co., the Court issued a decision affirming the Second Circuit's decision, but on different grounds, holding that the ATS did not create jurisdiction for a claim regarding conduct occurring outside the territory of the United States, leaving the question of corporate liability unresolved.

In Jesner v. Arab Bank, PLC, the Supreme Court again revisited the question of corporate liability and ruled that foreign corporations may not be sued under the ATS. However, the only parts of the opinion that commanded a majority of the court expressly limited its holding to suits against  corporations. The concurring opinions by Justices Alito and Gorsuch focused on foreign relations concerns with foreign corporations. Justice Alito expressly limited his concurrence to foreign corporations: "Because this case involves a foreign corporation, we have no need to reach the question whether an alien may sue a United States corporation under the ATS." Because the majority opinion was limited to foreign corporations, it is possible that Jesner does not settle the question of corporate liability for U.S. corporations.

In the most recent decision concerning the ATS, the Supreme Court ruled in Nestlé USA, Inc. v. DoeProminent cases under the statute

Doe v. Unocal

In September 1996, four Burmese villagers filed suit against Unocal and its parent company, the Union Oil Company of California; in October 1996, another fourteen villagers also brought suit. The suits alleged various human rights violations, including forced labor, wrongful death, false imprisonment, assault, intentional infliction of emotional distress and negligence, all relating to the construction of the Yadana gas pipeline project in Myanmar, formerly Burma.

In 2000, the district court dismissed the case on the grounds that Unocal could not be held liable unless Unocal wanted the military to commit abuses, and that plaintiffs had not made this showing. Plaintiffs appealed and ultimately, shortly prior to when the case was to be argued before the Ninth Circuit en banc court in December 2004, the parties announced that they had reached a tentative settlement. Once the settlement was finalized in March 2005, the appeal was withdrawn and the district court opinion from 2000 was also vacated.

According to a joint statement released by the parties, while the specific terms were confidential, "the settlement will compensate plaintiffs and provide funds enabling plaintiffs and their representatives to develop programs to improve living conditions, health care and education and protect the rights of people from the pipeline region. These initiatives will provide substantial assistance to people who may have suffered hardships in the region."

 Jesner v. Arab Bank, PLC 

On April 3, 2017, the Supreme Court agreed to hear the case Jesner v. Arab Bank, PLC, which asks the question: "Whether the Alien Tort Statute... categorically forecloses corporate liability." The case arose when plaintiffs and their families were injured by terrorist attacks in the Middle East over a ten-year period. American nationals brought their claim under the Anti-Terrorism Act, 18 U. S. C. §2333(a), and foreign nationals brought their claim under the ATS. The plaintiffs alleged that Arab Bank helped finance terrorism by allowing Hamas and other terrorist groups to use bank accounts for terrorists and to pay the families of suicide bombers.

The District Court, following the Second Circuit decision in Kiobel that corporations are immune from liability under the ATS, dismissed the ATS suit. The Second Circuit, also adhering to Kiobel, affirmed.

On April 24, 2018, the Supreme Court ruled that foreign corporations may not be sued under the Alien Tort Statute. Justice Kennedy wrote for a splintered majority. In the majority opinion, the Court expressed its concern for foreign relations problems if the Court were to extend liability to foreign corporations. "For 13 years, this litigation has 'caused significant diplomatic tensions' with Jordan, a critical ally in one of the world's most sensitive regions . . . These are the very foreign-relations tensions the First Congress sought to avoid." Justices Thomas, Alito, and Gorsuch concurred.

Justice Sotomayor wrote a 34-page dissent, arguing the decision "absolves corporations from responsibility under the ATS for conscience-shocking behavior." Immunizing corporations from liability "allows these entities to take advantage of the significant benefits of the corporate form and enjoy fundamental rights ... without having to shoulder attendant fundamental responsibilities."

Kiobel v. Royal Dutch Petroleum

The plaintiffs in Kiobel were citizens of Nigeria who claimed that Dutch, British, and Nigerian oil-exploration corporations aided and abetted the Nigerian government during the 1990s in committing violations of customary international law. The plaintiffs claimed that Royal Dutch Shell compelled its Nigerian subsidiary, in cooperation with the Nigerian government, to brutally crush peaceful resistance to aggressive oil development in the Ogoni Niger River Delta. Plaintiffs sought damages under the ATS. The defendants moved to dismiss based on a two-pronged argument. First, they argued that customary international law itself provides the rules by which to decide whether conduct violates the law of nations where non-state actors are alleged to have committed the wrong in question. Second, they contended that no norm has ever existed between nations that imposes liability upon corporate actors. On September 29, 2006, the district court dismissed the plaintiffs' claims for aiding and abetting property destruction; forced exile; extrajudicial killing; and violation of the rights to life, liberty, security, and association. It reasoned that customary international law did not define those violations with sufficient particularity. The court denied the defendants' motion to dismiss with respect to the remaining claims of aiding and abetting arbitrary arrest and detention; crimes against humanity; and torture or cruel, inhuman, and degrading treatment. The district court then certified its entire order for interlocutory appeal to the Second Circuit based on the serious nature of the questions at issue.

In a 2–1 decision issued on September 17, 2010, the U.S. Court of Appeals for the Second Circuit held that corporations cannot be held liable for violations of customary international law, finding that: (1) under both U.S. Supreme Court and Second Circuit precedents over the previous 30 years that address ATS suits alleging violations of customary international law, the scope of liability is determined by customary international law itself; (2) under Supreme Court precedent, the ATS requires courts to apply norms of international law—and not domestic law—to the scope of defendants' liabilities. Such norms must be "specific, universal and obligatory"; and (3) under international law, "corporate liability is not a discernible—much less a universally recognized—norm of customary international law", that the court could apply to the ATS, and that the plaintiffs' ATS claims should indeed be dismissed for lack of subject matter jurisdiction.

Kiobel petitioned the Supreme Court for review of the Second Circuit's decision, and this was granted on October 17, 2011. Oral arguments were held on February 28, 2012,  The arguments received considerable attention in the legal community. Unexpectedly, the Court announced on March 5, 2012 that it would hold additional arguments on the case during the October 2012 term, and directed the parties to file new briefs on the question "Whether and under what circumstances the Alien Tort Statute ... allows courts to recognize a cause of action for violations of the law of nations occurring within the territory of a sovereign other than the United States." The case was re-argued on October 1, 2012; on April 17, 2013 the Court held that there is a presumption that the ATS does not apply outside the United States.

Sarei v. Rio Tinto
In 2000, residents of the island of Bougainville in Papua New Guinea brought suit against multinational mining company Rio Tinto. The lawsuit is based on a 1988 revolt against Rio Tinto, and the plaintiffs allege that the Papua New Guinea government, using Rio Tinto helicopters and vehicles, killed about 15,000 people in an effort to put down the revolt. On October 25, 2011, the Ninth Circuit Court of Appeals, sitting en banc, issued a divided opinion holding that certain claims against a foreign corporation implicating the conduct of a foreign government on foreign soil could proceed under the ATS. The company filed a petitioned the Supreme Court for review of the decision; on April 22, 2013, the Supreme Court remanded the case back to the Ninth Circuit for further consideration in the light of its decision in Kiobel.

Kpadeh v. Emmanuel
Charles McArthur Emmanuel (also known as "Chuckie Taylor" or "Taylor Jr."), the son of former Liberian president Charles Taylor, was the commander of the infamously violent Anti-Terrorist Unit (ATU), commonly known in Liberia as the "Demon Forces". In 2006, U.S. officials arrested Taylor Jr. upon entering the U.S. (via the Miami International Airport) and the Department of Justice later charged him based on torture he committed in Liberia. He was convicted of multiple counts of torture and conspiracy to torture and was sentenced to 97 years in prison. The World Organization for Human Rights USA and the Florida International University College of Law filed a civil suit in the Southern District of Florida on behalf of five of Taylor Jr.'s victims pursuant to the Alien Tort Statute and the Torture Victim Protection Act. The plaintiffs won by default judgment as to liability on all counts, and in February 2010, following trial on damages at which Taylor appeared, the court found Taylor liable to the plaintiffs for damages of over $22 million.Rufus Kpadeh et al. v. Charles McArthur Emmanuel, No. 09-20050-civ (S.D. Fla. Feb. 5, 2010).

Presbyterian Church of Sudan v. Talisman Energy, Inc.
On October 2, 2009, the Court of Appeals for the Second Circuit, in Presbyterian Church of Sudan v. Talisman Energy, Inc., held that "the mens rea standard for aiding and abetting liability in Alien Tort Statute actions is purpose rather than knowledge alone." In this case—which involves allegations against a Canadian oil company concerning its purported assistance to the government in Sudan in the forced movement of civilians residing near oil facilities—the court concluded that "plaintiffs have not established Talisman's purposeful complicity in human rights abuses."  In reaching that conclusion, the Second Circuit stated that "the standard for imposing accessorial liability under the Alien Tort Statute must be drawn from international law; and that under international law a claimant must show that the defendant provided substantial assistance with the purpose of facilitating the alleged offenses."

Sinaltrainal v. Coca-Cola Company

On August 11, 2009, the Court of Appeals for the Eleventh Circuit issued a decision in Sinaltrainal v. Coca-Cola Company.  In this case, plaintiffs alleged that Coca-Cola bottlers in Colombia collaborated with Colombian paramilitary forces in "the systematic intimidation, kidnapping, detention, torture, and murder of Colombian trade unionists."  However, the district court dismissed the complaint and the Eleventh Circuit upheld that ruling.  In doing so, the Eleventh Circuit relied upon the Supreme Court's recent Ashcroft v. Iqbal decision in addressing the adequacy of the complaint, which must have "facial plausibility" to survive dismissal, and noted that Rule 8 of the Federal Rules of Civil Procedure demands "more than an unadorned, the-defendant-unlawfully-harmed-me accusation."  The Eleventh Circuit then applied the Iqbal standard to plaintiffs' allegations against Coca-Cola and held that they were insufficient to survive dismissal.

Bowoto v. Chevron Corp.

Nigerian villagers brought claims against Chevron Corp. regarding events that occurred on a Chevron offshore drilling platform in 1998, when Nigerian soldiers suppressed a protest against Chevron's environmental and business practices. The protesters, with the help of nonprofit organizations including the Center for Constitutional Rights, the Public Interest Lawyers Group, and EarthRights International, brought claims for wrongful death, torture, assault, battery, and negligence against Chevron, alleging that the company had paid the soldiers that landed on the platform and were therefore liable for the actions that they took. In December 2008, a jury found that Chevron was not liable.

Wang Xiaoning v. Yahoo!

In 2007, the World Organization for Human Rights USA filed a lawsuit against Yahoo! on behalf of Chinese dissidents Wang Xiaoning and Shi Tao (Guao Quingsheng), claiming jurisdiction under the ATS. According to the complaint, Wang and Shi Tao used Yahoo! accounts to share pro-democracy material, and a Chinese subsidiary of Yahoo! gave the Chinese government identifying information that allowed authorities to identify and arrest them. The Complaint alleges that the plaintiffs were subjected to "torture, cruel, inhuman, or other degrading treatment or punishment, arbitrary arrest and prolonged detention, and forced labor."

Yahoo! settled the case in November 2007 for an undisclosed amount of money, and it agreed to cover the plaintiff's legal costs as a part of the settlement. In a statement released after the settlement was made public, Yahoo! said that it would "provide 'financial, humanitarian and legal support to these families' and create a separate 'humanitarian relief fund' for other dissidents and their families."

 Nestlé USA, Inc. v. Doe 

The most recent case concerning the ATS was John Doe I, et al. v. Nestle, which was heard by the Supreme Court on December 1, 2020 and decided June 17, 2021. Consolidated with Cargill, Inc. v. Doe, the case alleges that Nestle and Cargill aided and abetted forced child labour in the Ivory Coast in connection with the harvesting of cocoa. The applicability of the ATS was interpreted by each circuit individually, with the Ninth and Fourth Circuits in support of investigating Nestle's liability, while the Second Circuit maintained that the Statute did not apply to corporate liability. In an 8–1 decision, the Supreme Court ruled that the U.S. federal judiciary lacked jurisdiction over the case due to neither corporate defendant having sufficient connections to the U.S. beyond "mere corporate presence".

The Nestle/Cargill ruling was assessed by international legal jurists as narrowing the scope of the ATS while failing to clarify whether or how corporate defendants may be liable thereunder. While the Court rejected "general corporate activity", such as the making of operational decisions, as insufficient U.S.-based conduct to establish jurisdiction under the Statute, it did not specify what activities or ties would meet the requirements. However, the Court rejected the defendants' argument to narrow the applicability of the ATS to abuses that take place on U.S. soil, and also disagreed with the Trump Administration's amicus curiae brief asserting that there should be no aiding and abetting cause of action under the Statute.

See also
 Aut dedere aut judicare

Notes

References

External links
 Corporate Liability Claims Not Actionable Under Alien Tort Statute in the Suffolk Transnational Law Review Debate over Founders' original intent with the Alien Tort Claims Act in the Harvard Law Record''
 Alien Tort Statute Today (last updated Feb. 2011)
 Alien Tort Statute Cases Resulting in Plaintiff Victories
 Alien Tort Statute: From Corporate Personhood to Corporate Humanity (TedX Hampshire College)

United States federal legislation articles without infoboxes
1789 in American law
United States federal judiciary legislation